Scott Baker (born May 18, 1970) is an American former professional baseball pitcher. He played one game in Major League Baseball (MLB) and one season in the Korea Baseball Organization.

Career
A graduate of Basic High School in Henderson, Nevada, Baker played his only major league game for the Oakland Athletics on July 17, 1995. In , he played for the KBO's Samsung Lions.

External links

Career statistics and player information from Korea Baseball Organization

1970 births
Living people
Akron Aeros players
Algodoneros de Unión Laguna players
American expatriate baseball players in Canada
American expatriate baseball players in South Korea
American expatriate baseball players in Mexico
Baseball players from San Jose, California
Chico Heat players
Diablos Rojos del México players
Edmonton Trappers players
Grays Harbor Gulls players
Guerreros de Oaxaca players
Huntsville Stars players
Johnson City Cardinals players
KBO League pitchers
Major League Baseball pitchers
Mexican League baseball pitchers
Oakland Athletics players
Samsung Lions players
Savannah Cardinals players
Solano Steelheads players
St. Petersburg Cardinals players
Taft Cougars baseball players
Tri-City Posse players